Raising Arizona is a 1987 American crime comedy film directed by Joel Coen, produced by Ethan Coen, and written by Joel and Ethan Coen. It stars Nicolas Cage as H.I. "Hi" McDunnough, an ex-convict, and Holly Hunter as Edwina "Ed" McDunnough, a former police officer and his wife. Other members of the cast include Trey Wilson, William Forsythe, John Goodman, Frances McDormand, Sam McMurray, and Randall "Tex" Cobb.

The Coen brothers set out to work on the film with the intention of making a film as different from their previous film, the dark thriller Blood Simple, as possible, with a lighter sense of humor and a faster pace. Raising Arizona received mixed reviews at the time of its release. Some criticized it as too self-conscious, manneristic, and unclear as to whether it was fantasy or realism. Other critics praised the film for its originality.

The film ranks 31st on the American Film Institute's 100 Years...100 Laughs list, and 45th on Bravo's "100 Funniest Movies" list. Raising Arizona was released in the United States on March 13, 1987.

Plot
Convenience store robber H.I. "Hi" McDunnough meets police officer Edwina ("Ed") as she takes his mugshots before one of multiple sentences in prison. During a later stay, Hi learns that Ed's fiancé has left her and proposes after being released. They marry and move into a desert mobile home, and Hi gets a job in a machine shop. They want to have children, but Ed is infertile and they cannot adopt due to Hi's criminal record.

Hi and Ed learn of the quintuplet sons known as the "Arizona Quints" born to regionally famous furniture magnate Nathan Arizona. They kidnap one of the babies, whom they believe to be Nathan Jr. Upon returning home, Hi's old cellmates Gale and Evelle Snoats arrive after escaping from prison. They convince Hi to shelter them and tempt him to return to his former life of crime. That night, Hi has an intense nightmare of monstrous biker Leonard Smalls.

Hi's foreman Glen and his large and unruly family visit on the next day. When Glen suggests that he and Hi exchange wives, Hi punches Glen in the face. That night, Hi succumbs to the temptation to rob a convenience store while buying baby diapers, leading to a chase with police and a pack of dogs that he manages to outrun. As Ed and Nathan Jr. sleep, Hi decides to leave his family to join Gale and Evelle in a bank robbery. 

Glen returns the next morning to fire Hi, revealing his inference that Hi and Ed kidnapped Nathan Jr. Glen threatens to turn them in unless they agree to give him and his wife custody of the child. Gale and Evelle overhear this conversation and, following a conflict with Hi, kidnap Nathan Jr. themselves. Once freed from bondage, Hi joins with a despondent Ed to rescue the baby. Meanwhile, Smalls approaches Nathan Arizona and offers to return his son for $50,000, but indicates his plan to sell the baby on the black market when Nathan Sr. refuses to pay.

Gale and Evelle grow attached to Nathan Jr. After nearly leaving him behind at a robbed convenience store, the two promise never to give him up. But they again leave Nathan Jr. behind during the bank robbery.  A dye pack explodes in their stolen money sack, covering them and the car interior with blue dye.  This distraction allows Smalls to capture the baby before Hi and Ed arrive. In the ensuing struggle, Ed grabs Nathan Jr. while Smalls severely beats Hi.  Hi uncovers Smalls's woodpecker tattoo, which matches his own, and ultimately manages to kill Smalls by detonating a hand grenade on Smalls's jacket.

Remorseful, Hi and Ed sneak into the Arizona home to return Nathan Jr. but are caught by Nathan Sr. Upon learning the reason for the kidnapping, Nathan Sr. sympathizes and decides not to report them.  When he hears that Hi and Ed plan to divorce, Nathan Sr. advises them to "sleep on it".

In the final scene, Hi sleeps beside Ed and has a series of prophetic dreams: Gale and Evelle willingly return to prison upon realizing they aren't ready to return to society, Glen is ticketed by a Polish-American police officer following "one Polack joke too many", and Nathan Jr. becomes a football star after receiving a football as a Christmas present from "a kindly couple who wish to remain unknown". The dream ends as an elderly couple (implied to be Hi and Ed) enjoys a holiday visit from a large family of children and grandchildren. Hi reflects on the reality of this dream and his conviction that he and Ed have the ability to be good and raise a good family, "if not in Arizona, then somewhere close...maybe it was Utah."

Cast

Production

Casting and conception
The Coen Brothers started working on Raising Arizona with the idea to make it as different as possible from their previous film, Blood Simple, by having it be far more optimistic and upbeat. The starting point of scriptwriting came from the idea of the character of Hi, who has the desire to live a regular life within the boundaries of the law. To create their characters' dialect, Joel and Ethan created a hybrid of local dialect and the assumed reading material of the characters, namely, magazines and the Bible. In contrast to Blood Simple, the characters in Raising Arizona were written to be very sympathetic. The Coens wrote the character Ed for Holly Hunter. The character of Leonard Smalls was created when the Coen Brothers tried to envision an "evil character" not from their imagination, but one that the character would have thought up. His name is widely thought to be a reference to the character of Lennie Small, from John Steinbeck's novella Of Mice and Men. John Goodman was drawn to characters of "great feeling, [guys] who could explode or start weeping at any moment" and became a frequent collaborator following his performance as Gale Snoats. The script took three and a half months to write.

The film was influenced by the works of director Preston Sturges and writers such as William Faulkner and Flannery O'Connor (who was known for her Southern literature; "She also has a great sense of eccentric character," Ethan Coen told one interviewer). Joel and Ethan showed the completed script to Circle Films, their American distributor for Blood Simple. Circle Films agreed to finance the movie. The Coens came to the set with a complete script and storyboard. With a budget of just over five million dollars, Joel Coen noted that "to obtain maximum from that money, the movie has to be meticulously prepared".

Filming
Raising Arizona was shot in ten weeks. Many crew members who had worked with Joel and Ethan on Blood Simple returned for Raising Arizona, including cinematographer Barry Sonnenfeld, co-producer Mark Silverman, production designer Jane Musky, associate producer and assistant director Deborah Reinisch, and film composer Carter Burwell.

The relationship between actor Nicolas Cage and the Coens was respectful, but turbulent. When he arrived on-set, and at various other points during production, Cage offered suggestions to the Coen brothers, which they ignored. Cage said that "Joel and Ethan have a very strong vision and I've learned how difficult it is to accept another artist's vision. They have an autocratic nature." Randall "Tex" Cobb also gave the Coens difficulty on set, with Joel noting that "he's less an actor than a force of nature ... I don't know if I'd rush headlong into employing him for a future film."

Release
Raising Arizona was initially released in the US, three dates; A New York City premiere on March 6, 1987, a limited release on March 13, 1987 and a nationwide release on April 17, 1987. The film was also released in Argentina on March 25, 1987 before it was screened out of competition at the 1987 Cannes Film Festival.

Despite the cult following of their later films, such as The Big Lebowski, in 2000 Ethan Coen described their second feature as "the last movie [we] made that made any significant amount of money".

Reception
On review aggregator Rotten Tomatoes, the film holds an approval rating of 90% based on 63 reviews, with an average rating of 7.8/10. The website's critical consensus reads, "A terrifically original, eccentric screwball comedy, Raising Arizona may not be the Coens' most disciplined movie, but it's one of their most purely entertaining." On Metacritic, the film has a weighted average score of 69 based on 23 reviews, indicating "generally favorable reviews". Audiences polled by CinemaScore gave the film an average grade of "B" on an A+ to F scale.

David Denby of New York wrote that the film was a "deranged fable of the New West" which turned "sarcasm into a rude yet affectionate mode of comedy". Richard Corliss of Time referred to the film as "exuberantly original". Rita Kempley of The Washington Post gave a positive review, stating that it was "the best kidnapping comedy since last summer's Ruthless People". On the film review television show Siskel & Ebert & the Movies, critic Gene Siskel said the film was as "good looking as it is funny" and that "despite some slow patches" he recommended the film, giving it a "thumbs up". Writing for The New Yorker, Pauline Kael wrote that "Raising Arizona is no big deal, but it has a rambunctious charm".

Negative reviews focused on a "style over substance" view of the film. Variety wrote, "While [Raising Arizona] is filled with many splendid touches and plenty of yocks, it often doesn't hold together as a coherent story." Writing for The New York Times, Vincent Canby wrote, "Like Blood Simple, it's full of technical expertise but has no life of its own ... The direction is without decisive style." Julie Salamon of the Wall Street Journal wrote that the Coen Brothers "have a lot of imagination and sense of fun—and, most of all, a terrific sense of how to manipulate imagery," but "by the end, the fun feels a little forced." Dave Kehr of the Chicago Tribune wrote that "the overlooked form peels away from the slight, frail content, and the film starts to look like an episode of Hee Haw directed by an amphetamine-crazed Orson Welles". Roger Ebert wrote a negative review, stating the film "stretches out every moment for more than it's worth, until even the moments of inspiration seem forced. Since the basic idea of the movie is a good one and there are talented people in the cast, what we have here is a film shot down by its own forced and mannered style."

Later writings about the film have been generally positive. Both the British film magazine Empire and film database Allmovie gave the film five stars, their highest ratings. Allmovie's Lucia Bozzola wrote, "Complete with carefully modulated over-the-top performances from the entire cast, Raising Arizona confirmed the Coens' place among the most distinctive filmmakers to emerge from the 1980s independent cinema", while Caroline Westbrook of Empire declared it a "hilarious, madcap comedy from the Coen brothers that demonstrates just why they are the kings of quirk". Bilge Ebiri considers Raising Arizona to be "the Coens' masterpiece — their funniest movie, and quite possibly their most poignant as well". The Dutch magazine Vrij Nederland placed its bank robbery scene second on their list of "the 5 best bank robberies in film history", behind a bank robbery scene from the 1995 thriller Heat. Actor Simon Pegg described the film as "a living, breathing Looney Tunes cartoon" during a BFI screening. Pegg's friend and frequent collaborator Edgar Wright has stated that Raising Arizona is his favorite film of all time. Likewise, Spike Lee put Raising Arizona on his "Essential Films" list.

The film is recognized by American Film Institute:
 2000: AFI's 100 Years...100 Laughs –

Soundtrack

The score to Raising Arizona is written by Carter Burwell, the second of his collaborations with the Coen brothers.  The sounds are a mix of organ, massed choir, banjo, whistling, and yodeling.

Themes are borrowed from the "Goofing Off Suite", originally recorded by Pete Seeger in 1955, which includes an excerpt from the Chorale movement of Ludwig van Beethoven's Symphony No. 9 and "Russian Folk Themes and Yodel". Credited musicians for the film include Ben Freed (banjo), Mieczyslaw Litwinski (Jew's harp and guitar), and John R. Crowder (yodeling). Holly Hunter sings a traditional murder ballad, "Down in the Willow Garden", as an incongruous "lullaby" during the film.

Selections from Burwell's score to Raising Arizona were released on an album in 1987, along with selections from the Coens' sole previous feature film, Blood Simple.  The tracks from Raising Arizona constitute the first ten tracks on a 17-track CD that also features selections from the Blood Simple soundtrack.

 "Introduction – A Hole in the Ground" – (0:38)
 "Way Out There (Main Title)" – (1:55)
 "He Was Horrible" – (1:30)
 "Just Business" – (1:17)
 "The Letter" – (2:27)
 "Hail Lenny" – (2:18)
 "Raising Ukeleles" – (3:41)
 "Dream of the Future" – (2:31)
 "Shopping Arizona" – (2:46)
 "Return to the Nursery" – (1:35)

AllMusic gave the album a rating of  (4.5 out of 5).

References

Bibliography

External links 

 
 
 
 
 

1987 films
1980s crime comedy films
1987 soundtrack albums
American black comedy films
Carter Burwell albums
1980s English-language films
Films about bank robbery
Films about child abduction in the United States
Films directed by the Coen brothers
Films scored by Carter Burwell
Films set in Phoenix, Arizona
Films set in Maricopa County, Arizona
Film scores
Varèse Sarabande soundtracks
American crime comedy films
1987 comedy films
1980s American films
English-language crime comedy films